The Sundown Heaven Town Tour was a current headlining concert tour by American country music artist, Tim McGraw. The tour was in support of his thirteenth studio album, Sundown Heaven Town (2014). It began on May 9, 2014, and ended on November 8, 2014.

Background
McGraw announced his forthcoming studio album and tour in January 2014. It will mark his first venture with Big Machine Records. In the release, he stated the album was set to be released in September 2014; however, the tour would begin May 2014. McGraw stated he was excited to perform new material, with four to five new songs appearing in the set list. Plans to expand the tour once the album is released are under consideration. Along the way, McGraw and wife (Faith Hill) opened for country music artist George Strait. They performed at the Gilette Stadium in Foxborough, Massachusetts. The concert was one of the last of Strait's career.

Concert synopsis
At most amphitheaters the show begins with Tim walking in from the rear of the reserved seats to the stage where he then sings his hit song One of Those Nights.

Setlist
The following setlist is obtained from the concert held on May 10, 2014, at the Shoreline Amphitheatre in Mountain View, California. It does not represent all shows during the tour.
"One of Those Nights"
"Real Good Man"
"I Like It, I Love It"
"Southern Voice"
"Red Rag Top"
"Mexicoma"
"Down on the Farm"
"Southern Girl"
"Just to See You Smile"
"Better Than I Used to Be"
"Lookin' for That Girl"
"Please Remember Me"
"Back When"
"Keep on Truckin'"
"Meanwhile Back at Mama's"
"You Are So Beautiful"
"The View"
"Highway Don't Care"
"City Lights"
"Where the Green Grass Grows"
"Two Lanes of Freedom"
"Indian Outlaw"
Encore 
"The Cowboy in Me"
"Truck Yeah"
"Something Like That"
"Felt Good on My Lips"
"Live Like You Were Dying"

Tour dates

Festivals and other miscellaneous performances

Redfest
Faster Horses Festival
Jamboree in the Hills
K-Days
Cheyenne Frontier Nights
Pepsi Outdoor Summer Concerts
Watershed Music Festival
Oregon Jamboree
Sunfest Music Festival
Sneak-Away Sunday Nights
Minnesota State Fair
Great Allentown Fair
Woodystock
DuPont/Pioneer Summer Concert Series

Band
Musical director: Denny Heminson
Banjo: Bob Minner
Drum: Shawn Fichter
Fiddle: Deano Brown
Acoustic guitar: Bob Minner
Bass guitar: Paul Bushnell
Electric guitar: Denny Hemingson, David Levita and Adam Shoenfeld
Steel guitar: Denny Hemingson
Keyboards: Billy Nobel
Piano: Deano Brown
Supporting vocals: Deano Brown, Paul Bushnell and Billy Nobel
Source:

References

External links

2014 concert tours
Tim McGraw concert tours